Arnaldo González (born May 13, 1989 in Quilmes, Buenos Aires, Argentina) is an Argentine professional footballer who plays as an attacking midfielder for Argentine Primera División club Patronato de Paraná.

Teams
 Quilmes 2010–2011
 Defensores de Belgrano 2011–2012
 Santamarina de Tandil 2012–2013
 Quilmes 2013–2014
 Santamarina de Tandil 2015
 San Luis de Quillota 2016
 Patronato
 Central Córdoba (SdE) 2017
 Aldosivi 2017–2018
 Nueva Chicago 2018–2020
 Mitre (SdE) 2020

External links
 
 
 

1989 births
Living people
People from Quilmes
Sportspeople from Buenos Aires Province
Argentine footballers
Association football midfielders
Chilean Primera División players
Argentine Primera División players
Quilmes Atlético Club footballers
Club y Biblioteca Ramón Santamarina footballers
Defensores de Belgrano footballers
Club Atlético Patronato footballers
San Luis de Quillota footballers
Argentine expatriate footballers
Argentine expatriate sportspeople in Chile
Expatriate footballers in Chile